The 2011 ICC World Cricket League Africa Region Twenty20 Division Three was a cricket tournament that took place between 24–27 February 2011. Ghana hosted the event.

Teams
Teams that qualified are as follows:

Pool A

Group B

Fixtures

Group stage

Pool A

Pool B

Play-offs

See also

2012 ICC World Twenty20 Qualifier
World Cricket League Africa Region

References

2012 ICC World Twenty20